Gang Busters is a 1942 Universal movie serial based on the radio series Gang Busters.

Plot
The city is terrorized by a crime wave masterminded by the elusive, soft-spoken Professor Mortis (Ralph Morgan) from his base in a forgotten cavern beneath the rails of the city's subway line. He declares over the radio that The League of Murdered Men will exact revenge upon the city officials. Mortis's gang members were officially pronounced dead in prison but revived by medical genius Mortis, who recruited them to do his bidding.

Police detective Bill Bannister (Kent Taylor) is visited by his brother, a reformed criminal who will inform on Mortis. Mortis's men kill the informant before he talks, and detective Bannister vows to get Mortis. Bannister, together with his partner Tim Nolan (Robert Armstrong), and police chief Martin O'Brien (Joseph Crehan) use the latest police methods to track down Mortis. Following the story are newspaper reporter Vicki Logan (Irene Hervey) and her photographer Happy Haskins (Richard Davies).

Cast
Starring:
 Kent Taylor as Det. Lt. Bill Bannister
 Irene Hervey as Vicki Logan, reporter
 Ralph Morgan as Professor Mortis
 Robert Armstrong as Det. Tim Nolan

Featuring:
 Richard Davies as Happy Haskins, news photographer
 Joseph Crehan as Police Chief Martin O'Brien
 George Watts as Mayor Hansen
 Ralf Harolde as Chief Henchman Halliger
 William Haade as Henchman Mike Taboni
 John Gallaudet as Henchman Wilkerson
 George J. Lewis as Henchman Mason
 Victor Zimmerman as Henchman Bernard
 Johnnie Berkes as Newsboy–Henchman Grubb
 Edward Emerson as "Frenchy" Ludoc

With:
 Pat O'Malley as the Police Scientist
 Beatrice Roberts as the Chief's Secretary
 Riley Hill as Jim Bannister (Ch. 1)
 Grace Cunard as landlady (Ch. 1)
 Eddie Dean as Blair, ballistics expert (Chs. 1, 6)
 Eddie Foster as Henchman Jerry Rogan (Chs. 3–4)
 Stanley Price as Henchman Corky Watts (Chs. 4–5)
 Ethan Laidlaw as Ludoc's bartender (Chs. 5, 7–8)
 Mickey Simpson as Bruiser, Ludoc's bouncer (Ch. 7)
 Karl Hackett as Henry, crooked watchman (Chs. 7–8)
 Phil Warren as Henchman McKay (Chs. 8–9)
 Jack Mulhall as Chemist Richards (Chs. 9, 11)
 Jerry Jerome as Henchman Soupy Collins (Chs. 10–11)
 Paul McVey as Attorney J.B. "Harry" Malloy (Ch. 12)
 Dick Hogan as announcer during opening titles

Production
Gang Busters is one of Universal's most elaborate serials, with many chase and thrill scenes expertly staged in outdoor locations. The directors were Ray Taylor, veteran director responsible for many hit serials, and Noel M. Smith, former silent-screen director who specialized in fast action (Smith directed many of Larry Semon's stunt-filled comedies of the 1920s). Some of the footage in Gang Busters was so good that Universal often reused it in its later cliffhangers.

Universal had been making adventure serials since the 1910s, and achieved major success with its Flash Gordon serials of the late 1930s. By the early 1940s serials were usually shown to juvenile audiences at weekend matinees. Universal intended Gang Busters for adult audiences and possible weeknight showings, and staged the action as a straight crime drama. The studio introduced a new "Streamlined Serials" format to distinguish it from its previous chapter plays. Instead of beginning each chapter with a printed synopsis of the storyline, the new format had the action in each chapter starting immediately. The story characters were shown discussing the latest developments and recapping the story themselves.

As a publicity gimmick, Universal hired its "serial queen" of the 1910s, former action star Grace Cunard, to work in Gang Busters. She appears only in the first chapter, as the landlady of a boarding house, but she received prominent billing in the promotional posters and advertising.

Critical reception
Gang Busters was very successful in its original release, and was re-released in 1949 by Film Classics, Inc.

Authors Jim Harmon and Donald F. Glut described Gang Busters as a "well made and interesting serial.", and William C. Cline considered the serial one of Universal's best and that Professor Mortis is one of the best characters ever created for a serial.

Chapter titles
 The League of Murdered Men
 The Death Plunge
 Murder Blockade
 Hangman's Noose
 Man Undercover
 Under Crumbling Walls
 The Water Trap
 Murder by Proxy
 Gang Bait
 Mob Vengeance
 Wanted at Headquarters
 The Long Chance
 Law and Order
Source:

See also
 List of film serials by year
 List of film serials by studio

References

External links

1942 films
1942 crime drama films
American black-and-white films
1940s English-language films
Universal Pictures film serials
Films based on radio series
Films directed by Ray Taylor
Films directed by Noel M. Smith
American crime drama films
Films with screenplays by George H. Plympton
1940s American films